Harold Henderson "Doc" Earthman (April 13, 1900 – February 26, 1987) was an American politician and a U.S. Representative from Tennessee.

Biography
Born in Murfreesboro, Tennessee, Earthman was the son of Vernon King Earthman, a physician, and his wife Virginia May Henderson Earthman. He attended the public schools, Webb School at Bell Buckle, Tennessee, Southern Methodist University at Dallas, Texas, and the University of Texas at Austin. He married Mary Wilson Moore in 1920, and they had four children: Harold, Mary, Virginia, and Ben.

Career
During World War I, Earthman served in the United States Army as a private and was assigned to the Student Army Training Corps. After moving to Nashville, Tennessee, he engaged in the banking business from 1921 to 1925. Admitted to the bar in 1926, he commenced the practice of law in Murfreesboro, Tennessee, engaged in agricultural pursuits and was owner of Earthman Enterprises. He resumed the study of law and was graduated from Cumberland School of Law at Cumberland University, Lebanon, Tennessee, in 1927.

Earthman was a member of the Tennessee House of Representatives in 1931 and 1932. In the Tennessee House, he aligned with himself with Tennessee political boss E. H. Crump. He served as associate administrator of war bonds for the State of Tennessee from 1940 to 1946, as well as judge of Rutherford County, Tennessee from 1942 to 1945.

Elected as a Democrat to the Seventy-ninth Congress, Earthman served in that capacity from January 3, 1945, to January 3, 1947, representing Tennessee's 5th congressional district. He sought renomination in 1946, but lost in the primary to Joe L. Evins. After leaving Congress, he resumed the practice of law and pursued business interests, establishing the first self-service laundry in Murfreesboro.

Death
Earthman died on February 26, 1987, in Murfreesboro.  He is interred there at Evergreen Cemetery.

References

External links

1900 births
1987 deaths
Democratic Party members of the Tennessee House of Representatives
People from Murfreesboro, Tennessee
United States Army soldiers
Webb School (Bell Buckle, Tennessee) alumni
Democratic Party members of the United States House of Representatives from Tennessee
20th-century American politicians
United States Army personnel of World War I